Michael or Mike Fanning may refer to:

Sports
Mike Fanning (American football) (1953–2022), American football player
Michael Fanning (Gaelic footballer), Irish Gaelic footballer
Mick Fanning (born 1981), Australian surfer

Others
Michael Fanning (politician) (c. 1865 – 1950), Irish politician
Mike Fanning (politician) (born 1967), American politician